Do Your Thing, or Do Ya Thang may refer to:

Film and TV
Dil Chahta Hai (Hindī : दिल चाहता है, English: The Heart Desires, but billed as Do Your Thing) 2001 Indian film

Music

Albums
You Do Your Thing, by Montgomery Gentry, 2004
 Do Your Thing, by Papa Mali, 2007
 Do Your Thing, by Jackie Wilson, 1968

Songs 
 "Do Your Thing" (7 Mile song), 1998
 "Do Your Thing" (Basement Jaxx song), 2003
 "Do Your Thing" (Charles Wright & the Watts 103rd Street Rhythm Band song), 1968
 "Do Ya Thing" (Gorillaz song)
 "Do Ya Thang" (Ice Cube song)
 "Do Ya Thang" (Rihanna song)
 "Do Your Thing", by Isaac Hayes, and covered by The Temptations, 1972, and James and Bobby Purify, 1974
 Do Your Thing, by Jungle Brothers, 2002
 "Do Your Thing", 2001 song by NSYNC from Celebrity

See also
Do Ya Thang (disambiguation)